Ingria is a comune (municipality) in the Metropolitan City of Turin in the Italian region Piedmont, located about  north of Turin in the Valle Soana.

Ingria borders the following municipalities: Ronco Canavese, Traversella, Frassinetto, Pont Canavese, and Sparone.

References

Cities and towns in Piedmont